The M271 is a  long motorway near Southampton in Hampshire, England.  Construction began in 1973 and it opened in 1975. It provides part of the route to Southampton Docks from the M27, which in turn makes up another part of the route to the docks from the nearby M3 Motorway.

Route
The motorway begins at Redbridge near Totton at a grade separated roundabout with the A35, heading north, briefly as a dual three-lane motorway.  At its first junction, it reduces to two lanes and continues east of Hillyfields.  After a further  it reaches a junction with the M27 at a signal controlled roundabout. North of the M27 it enters the countryside and terminates after a further mile of dual two-lane road at another roundabout, this time with the A3057 near Upton.

Hampshire County Council's Long Term Transport Plan to 2026 (LTTP) identifies the need for an 'M271 Spur' at the southern end to connect it to the A33 towards the docks in a free-flow interchange.

Junctions
{| class="plainrowheaders wikitable"
|-
!scope=col|County
!scope=col|Location
!scope=col|mi
!scope=col|km
!scope=col|Junction
!scope=col|Destinations
!scope=col|Notes
|-
|rowspan="4"|Hampshire
|rowspan="4"|Southampton
|0
|0
|—
|  - Southampton   - Bournemouth 
|
|-
|0.8
|1.3
|1
|Maybush, Nursling
|
|-
|1.6
|2.6
|—
|  - Bournemouth, Portsmouth
|
|-
|2.3
|3.7
|—
|  - Maybush, Nursling, Romsey
|

*Ceremonial Counties

Coordinate list

See also 

 List of motorways in the United Kingdom

References

External links

 CBRD Motorway Database – M271
 Pathetic Motorways – M271
 The Motorway Archive – M27/M271/M275/A3(M)
 Hampshire County Council LTTP 2011–2026

2-0271
Transport in Southampton
2-0271